This is a list of episodes of the ABC television series The Young Riders.

Series overview

Episodes

Season 1 (1989–90)

Season 2 (1990–91)

Season 3 (1991–92)

External links
 

Young Riders, The